This article lists all rugby league footballers who have played first-grade for the Dolphins in the Australian National Rugby League.

Notes
 Players are listed in alphabetical order.
 Previous club: refers to the previous first-grade rugby league club (NRL or Super League) that the player played at and does not refer to any junior club, rugby union club or a rugby league club he was signed to but never played at.
 Appearances: Dolphins games only, not a total of their career games.
 The statistics in this table are correct as of round 3 of the 2023 NRL season.

List of players

References

RLP List of Players
RLP Dolphins Transfers & Debuts

Lists of Australian rugby league players
National Rugby League lists